Core Pacific City, also known as the Living Mall, was a shopping center in Songshan District, Taipei, Taiwan.

History
The shopping mall was built in 2001. During the mall's development and construction, it was touted as the world's first truly 24-hour mall and Asia's first "city within a city" complex. When it first opened, the mall was open 24 hours a day, 7 days a week.

Before Core Pacific opened in 2001, its management had been fined by the Taipei city government for failing fire safety inspections. Further fines were levied when the mall opened to the public without actually first obtaining an operating license. In February 2002, a fire at the mall required the evacuation of 20,000 people. The fire was determined to be arson, and in July 2002 former Core Pacific official Lin Chang-cheng (林長成) was convicted of the crime along with two others, Wang Lin-kwun (王林坤) and Lin Ching-chi (林清吉). Losses were estimated at NT$12 million. The opening of Taipei 101's mall in 2003 was expected to affect the revenues of Core Pacific's tenants, although less severely than at other malls due to Core Pacific's lower price points. In 2004, the mall's management company was cited by Taiwan's Fair Trade Commission for unfair trade practices relating to a gift certificate promotion campaign.

In March 2018, the Core Pacific Group put up the shopping mall for auction with real estate broker Cushman & Wakefield. The auction opened to the public on 12 December 2018 with an opening price of NT$38 billion.

Core Pacific City closed on 30 November 2019 and subsequently demolished. On its final day of operation, 100,000 people came to the mall.

Architecture
The shopping mall had a total floor space of 204,190 m2. The structure was a complex of two buildings - an L-shaped building which contains specialty boutiques connected to a sphere which contains the Mira Department Store. The complex consisted of 12 above-ground stories and 7 underground levels. Core Pacific's total 19 story height is attributed to Taipei's extremely expensive land costs.

The sphere, considered to be Core Pacific's most dominant and visible feature, is 11 stories tall and clad in granite imported from Finland, while the L-shaped portion features granite from Spain. The mall's architects were the Jerde Partnership and Artech, Inc. Jerde won the 2002 Gold Nugget Special Award of Excellence at the Pacific Coast Builders Conference/Western Building Show for its effort. The engineering firm Arup was also recognized in 2002 for its work on the mall with a Structural Engineering Association of California Award for Excellence.

In popular culture
 The mall appeared on The Amazing Race 19 as the site of a Hazard task for the Vegas showgirls Kaylani & Lisa, where they had to perform an indoor bungee jump.
 In the 2003 video game SimCity 4 developed by Maxis, the mall was selected as a landmark which players can choose to build in their cities.

See also
SM Mall of Asia

References

External links

Photo of sphere, exterior
Photo of sphere, interior
Architect Jon Jerde's urban vision, Wired Magazine
Seismic design study by Arup
Emporis data

2001 establishments in Taiwan
2019 disestablishments in Taiwan
Former buildings and structures in Taiwan
Buildings and structures destroyed by arson
Shopping malls disestablished in 2019
Shopping malls established in 2001
Defunct shopping malls in Taiwan
Shopping malls in Taipei